Leon Radošević (born 26 February 1990) is a Croatian professional basketball player for Derthona Basket of the Italian LBA. He holds German citizenship since 2017.

Professional career
Radošević made his professional career debut with Cibona Zagreb in 2009. On July 17, 2011, he signed a contract with Emporio Armani Milano. On June 29, 2012, it was announced that Olimpia Milano loaned Radošević to Lietuvos rytas. On January 15, 2013, he left Lietuvos rytas and returned to Emporio Armani Milano. On July 30, 2013, Radošević signed a two–year deal with Alba Berlin.

On September 16, 2015, he signed with Turkish club Beşiktaş. On November 17, 2015, he left Beşiktaş and signed with the German club Brose Bamberg until the end of the season. On April 10, 2016, he re-signed with Brose for three more seasons.

On July 13, 2022, he has signed with Derthona Basket of the Italian LBA.

International career
Radošević represented his national team in U-16, U-18 and U-20 competitions, winning a bronze medal at the 2008 European U-18 Championship.

Career statistics

EuroLeague

|-
| style="text-align:left;"| 2009–10
| style="text-align:left;" rowspan=2| Cibona
| 16 || 8 || 15.2 || .581 || .000|| .526 || 3.0 || .4 || .6 || .2 || 3.8 || 3.8
|-
| style="text-align:left;"| 2010–11
| 9 || 9 || 32.7 || .505 || .000 || .815 || 6.3 || 1.3 || 1.2 || .4 || 12.9 || 15.8
|-
| style="text-align:left;"| 2011–12
| style="text-align:left;"| Milano
| 14 || 2 || 9.2 || .515 || .000 || .833 || 1.3 || .3 || .2 || .3 || 3.5 || 3.2
|-
| style="text-align:left;"| 2012–13
| style="text-align:left;"| Lietuvos rytas
| 10 || 2 || 21.3 || .535 || .000 || .710 || 3.8 || 1.1 || 1.0 || .7 || 9.8 || 10.8
|-
| style="text-align:left;"| 2014–15
| style="text-align:left;"| Alba Berlin
| 22 || 21 || 20.9 || .488 || .000 || .717 || 3.6 || .8 || .6 || .4 || 9.0 || 6.8
|-
| style="text-align:left;"| 2015–16
| style="text-align:left;"| Brose Bamberg
| 19 || 12 || 18.3 || .552 || .000 || .712 || 3.5 || .6 || .3 || .4 || 7.5 || 8.4
|-
| style="text-align:left;"| 2016–17
| style="text-align:left;"| Brose Bamberg
| 28 || 21 || 16.1 || .558 || .000 || .634 || 2.6 || .6 || .4 || .3 || 6.1 || 5.9
|- class="sortbottom"
| style="text-align:left;"| Career
| style="text-align:left;"|
| 71 || 42 || 19.8 || .512 || .000 || .723 || 3.4 || .7 || .7 || .4 || 7.3 || 7.1

References

External links
 Leon Radošević at eurobasket.com
 Leon Radošević at euroleague.net
 Leon Radošević at fiba.com

1990 births
Living people
Alba Berlin players
BC Rytas players
Beşiktaş men's basketball players
Brose Bamberg players
Centers (basketball)
Croatian men's basketball players
Croatian expatriate basketball people in Germany
Croatian expatriate basketball people in Italy
Croatian expatriate basketball people in Lithuania
FC Bayern Munich basketball players
German men's basketball players
German expatriate basketball people in Italy
German expatriate basketball people in Lithuania
German people of Croatian descent
KK Cibona players
Olimpia Milano players
People from Sisak